Group A of the 2014 Toulon Tournament was one of two groups competing of nations at 2014 Toulon Tournament. The group's first round of matches were played on 21 May 2014, with the final round played on 29 May. All ten matches were played at venues in France, in Toulon, Hyères, Aubagne and Saint-Raphaël. The group consisted of four previous champions, including France, as well as Portugal, Chile and Mexico and China, the latter which reached the final in 2007.

Standings

All Times are Central European Summer Time (CEST)

Mexico vs Portugal

France vs Chile

Portugal vs Chile

France vs China

China vs Chile

France vs Mexico

Chile vs Mexico

China vs Portugal

China vs Mexico

France vs Portugal

References

External links
 

A
2013–14 in French football
2013–14 in Portuguese football
2013–14 in Mexican football
2013–14 in Chilean football
2014 in Chinese football